The North Fork Republican River is a  tributary of the Republican River.  It flows eastward from a source in Yuma County, Colorado to just north of Haigler in Dundy County, Nebraska.   There it joins with the Arikaree River to form the Republican River.

Use of water from the North Fork Republican River is governed by the Republican River Compact, a water agreement among the U.S. states of Colorado, Nebraska, and Kansas signed on 1942-12-31.

See also

List of rivers in Colorado
List of rivers in Nebraska
Colorado drainage basins

References

External links
Republican River Compact

Rivers of Colorado
Rivers of Nebraska
Bodies of water of Dundy County, Nebraska
Tributaries of the Kansas River
Rivers of Yuma County, Colorado